Maison du Val de Villé is a museum in Albé in the Bas-Rhin department of France. Since 1982, it has been housed in the former mairie. It presents collections related to distillery, weaving, and all the proto-industrial activities of the Val de Villé region.

See also
List of museums in France

References

Local museums in France
Museums in Bas-Rhin